Trochosuchus is an extinct genus of therocephalian therapsids.

See also

 List of therapsids

References

 The main groups of non-mammalian synapsids at Mikko's Phylogeny Archive

Therocephalia genera
Permian synapsids of Africa
Fossil taxa described in 1908
Taxa named by Robert Broom